"You'll Be Mine" is a song by Australian DJ and recording artist, Havana Brown featuring Dutch DJ R3hab. It was released in July 2012 as the second single from her When the Lights Go Out EP.
The song failed to impact the ARIA Singles Chart as sales counted towards the When the Lights Go Out EP.

An extended mix of the track, as well as a remix by R3hab and ZROQ was digitally released exclusively to Beatport on 21 September 2012  and was later released on Spotify.

Song information
The pop/rock recording is an up-tempo song set in common time. It is written in the key of E major and moves at 127 beats per minute.

Brown described the inspiration behind "You'll Be Mine" saying, "when you're naive; when you don't necessarily know too much about someone, but you have a crush on them and in your mind you're dreaming about dating them, marrying them, having children, and you believe that they're perfect."

Track listing

References 

2012 songs
2012 singles
Songs written by RedOne
Songs written by Bilal Hajji
Songs written by AJ Junior
Havana Brown (musician) songs